Japan competed at the 1984 Summer Olympics in Los Angeles, United States. Japan returned to the Games after participating in the American-led boycott of the 1980 Summer Olympics. 226 competitors, 174 men and 52 women, took part in 147 events in 22 sports.

Medalists

| width=78% align=left valign=top |

| width=22% align=left valign=top |

Archery

In their third Olympic archery competition, Japan won a bronze medal in the men's division as well as having a fourth place competitor in each division.

Women's Individual Competition:
Hiroko Ishizu – 2525 points (4th place)
Minako Hokari – 2481 points (10th place)

Men's Individual Competition:
Hiroshi Yamamoto – 2563 points (Bronze Medal)
Takayoshi Matsushita – 2552 points (4th place)
Ichiro Shimamura – 2312 points (52nd place)

Athletics

Men's 400 metres 
Susumu Takana  
 Heat — 46.26
 Quarterfinals — 45.91
 Semifinals — 45.88 (→ did not advance)

Men's 10,000 metres
 Yutaka Kanai
 Qualifying Heat — 28:14.67 
 Final — 28:27.06 (→ 7th place)

 Masanari Shintaku
 Qualifying Heat — 28:24.30
 Final — 28:55.54 (→ 16th place)

Men's Marathon
 Takeshi So
 Final — 2:10:55 (→ 4th place)

 Toshihiko Seko
 Final — 2:14:13 (→ 14th place)

 Shigeru So
 Final — 2:14:38 (→ 17th place)

Men's Long Jump
 Junichi Usui
 Qualification — 8.02m
 Final — 7.87m (→ 7th place)

Men's High Jump
 Takao Sakamoto
 Qualification — 2.21m (→ did not advance)

Men's Javelin Throw 
 Masami Yoshida 
 Qualification — 81.42m 
 Final — 81.98m (→ 5th place)

 Kazuhiro Mizoguchi 
 Qualification — 74.82m (→ did not advance, 20th place)

Men's Hammer Throw 
 Shigenobu Murofushi 
 Qualification — 70.92m (→ did not advance)

Men's Pole Vault
 Tomomi Takahashi
 Qualifying Round — 5.30m 
 Final — no mark (→ no ranking)

Women's Marathon 
 Nanae Sasaki 
 Final — 2:37:04 (→ 19th place)

 Akemi Masuda 
 Final — did not finish (→ no ranking)

Women's High Jump 
 Hisayo Fukumitsu 
 Qualification — 1.87m (→ did not advance, 17th place)

 Megumi Sato 
 Qualification — 1.84m (→ did not advance, 18th place)

Women's Javelin Throw 
 Emi Matsui 
 Qualification — 57.72m (→ did not advance)

 Minori Mori 
 Qualification — 56.60m (→ did not advance)

Boxing

Men's Light Flyweight (– 48 kg)
 Mamoru Kuroiwa
 First Round — Bye
 Second Round — Defeated Francisco Tejedor (COL), 4:1
 Quarterfinals — Lost to Keith Mwila (KEN), 0:5

Men's Bantamweight (– 54 kg)
Hiroaki Takami
 First Round — Bye
 Second Round — Defeated Gamaleldin El-Koumy (EGY), 4:1
 Third Round — Lost to Dale Walters (CAN), 0:5

Canoeing

Cycling

Nine cyclists, eight men and one woman, represented Japan in 1984. Tsutomu Sakamoto won a bronze medal in the sprint event.

Men's individual road race
 Matsuyoshi Takahashi — 45th place

Sprint
 Tsutomu Sakamoto
 Katsuo Nakatake

1000m time trial
 Tsutomu Sakamoto

Team pursuit
 Akio Kuwazawa
 Harumitsu Okada
 Mitsugi Sarudate
 Yoshihiro Tsumuraya

Points race
 Akio Kuwazawa
 Hitoshi Sato

Women's individual road race
 Wakako Abe — 40th place

Diving

Men's 3m Springboard
Isao Yamagishi
 Preliminary Round — 427.14 (→ did not advance, 25th place)

Equestrianism

Fencing

Nine fencers, five men and four women, represented Japan in 1984.

Men's foil
 Kenichi Umezawa
 Nobuyuki Azuma
 Tadashi Shimokawa

Men's team foil
 Nobuyuki Azuma, Yoshihiko Kanatsu, Hidehachi Koyasu, Tadashi Shimokawa, Kenichi Umezawa

Women's foil
 Azusa Oikawa
 Mieko Miyahara
 Miyuki Maekawa

Women's team foil
 Mieko Miyahara, Azusa Oikawa, Miyuki Maekawa, Tomoko Oka

Gymnastics

Handball

Men's Team Competition
Preliminary Round (Group A)
Lost to Yugoslavia (15:32)
Lost to Romania (22:28)
Lost to Iceland (17:21)
Lost to Switzerland (13:20)
Defeated Algeria (17:16)
Classification Match
9th/10th place: Lost to United States (16:24) → 10th place

Team Roster
Seimei Gamo
Takashi Ikenoue
Yasou Ikona
Hidetada Ito
Koji Matsui
Mitsuaki Nakamoto
Kiyoshi Nishiyama
Takahiro Ohata
Nobuo Sasaki
Kenzo Seki
Yoshihiro Shiga
Katsutoshi Taguchi
Seiichi Takamura
Yukihiko Uemura
Shinji Yamamoto

Judo

Modern pentathlon

Three male pentathletes represented Japan in 1984.

Individual
 Shoji Uchida
 Hiroyuki Kawazoe
 Daizou Araki

Team
 Shoji Uchida
 Hiroyuki Kawazoe
 Daizou Araki

Rhythmic gymnastics

Rowing

Sailing

Shooting

Men

Women

Open

Swimming

Men's 100m Freestyle
Shigeo Ogata
 Heat — 52.96 (→ did not advance, 33rd place)

Satoshi Sumida
 Heat — 53.83 (→ did not advance, 39th place)

Men's 200m Freestyle
Hiroshi Sakamoto
 Heat — 1:54.71 (→ did not advance, 26th place)

Shigeo Ogata
 Heat — 1:55.97 (→ did not advance, 33rd place)

Men's 400m Freestyle
Shigeo Ogata
 Heat — 4:02.97 (→ did not advance, 22nd place)

Keisuke Okuno
 Heat — 4:06.31 (→ did not advance, 27th place)

Men's 100m Backstroke 
Daichi Suzuki
 Heat — 58.37
 B-Final — 58.30 (→ 11th place)

Men's 200m Backstroke 
Daichi Suzuki
 Heat — 2:06.24
 B-Final — 2:06.02 (→ 16th place)

Men's 100m Breaststroke
Shigehiro Takahashi
 Heat — 1:04.71
 B-Final — 1:04.41 (→ 10th place)

Kenji Watanabe
 Heat — 1:06.10 (→ did not advance, 9th place)

Men's 200m Breaststroke
Shigehiro Takahashi
 Heat — 2:19.98
 B-Final — 2:20.93 (→ 12th place)

Kenji Watanabe
 Heat — 2:22.33
 B-Final — 2:22.29 (→ 15th place)

Men's 100m Butterfly
Taihei Saka
 Heat — 56.40 (→ did not advance, 21st place)

Shudo Kawawa
 Heat — 56.52 (→ did not advance, 23rd place)

Men's 200m Butterfly
Taihei Saka
 Heat — 2:00.66
 B-Final — 2:00.31 (→ 9th place)

Shudo Kawawa
 Heat — 2:03.07 (→ did not advance, 18th place)

Men's 200m Individual Medley
Shinji Ito
 Heat — 2:07.76
 B-Final — 2:06.07 (→ 10th place)

Men's 400m Individual Medley
Shinji Ito
 Heat — 4:30.52
 B-Final — 4:29.76 (→ 13th place)

Men's 4 × 100 m Freestyle Relay 
Hiroshi Sakamoto, Shigeo Ogata, Taihei Saka, and Satoshi Sumida
 Heat — 3:30.45 (→ did not advance, 13th place)

Men's 4 × 200 m Freestyle Relay 
Taihei Saka, Hiroshi Sakamoto, Keisuke Okuno, and Shigeo Ogata
 Heat — DSQ (→ did not advance, no ranking)

Men's 4 × 100 m Medley Relay 
Daichi Suzuki, Shigehiro Takahashi, Taihei Saka, and Hiroshi Sakamoto
 Heat — 3:50.14
 Final — DSQ (→ no ranking)

Women's 100m Freestyle
Kaori Yanase
 Heat — 58.47 (→ did not advance, 17th place)

Chikako Nakamori
 Heat — 59.00 (→ did not advance, 21st place)

Women's 200m Freestyle 
Chikako Nakamori
 Heat — 2:03.94
 B-Final — 2:04.11 (→ 13th place)

Kaori Yanase
 Heat — 2:04.38
 B-Final — 2:05.24 (→ 16th place)

Women's 400m Freestyle 
Chikako Nakamori
 Heat — 4:20.13
 B-Final — 4:20.18 (→ 14th place)

Junko Sakurai
 Heat — 4:28.68 (→ did not advance, 19th place)

Women's 800m Freestyle 
Junko Sakurai
 Heat — 9:13.27 (→ did not advance, 18th place)

Women's 4 × 100 m Freestyle Relay
Junko Sakurai, Chikako Nakamori, Miki Saito, and Kaori Yanase
 Heat — 3:54.68 (→ did not advance)

Women's 4 × 100 m Medley Relay
Naomi Sekido, Hiroko Nagasaki, Naoko Kume, and Kaori Yanase
 Heat — 4:17.59
 Final — DSQ (→ no ranking)

Women's 100m Backstroke
Naomi Sekido
 Heat — 1:05.60 (→ did not advance, 18th place)

Nozomi Sunouchi
 Heat — 1:07.23 (→ did not advance, 23rd place)

Women's 200m Backstroke
Naomi Sekido
 Heat — 2:18.52
 B-Final — 2:18.87 (→ 14th place)

Nozomi Sunouchi
 Heat — 2:25.05 (→ did not advance, 22nd place)

Women's 200m Butterfly
Naoko Kume
 Heat — 2:13.31
 Final — 2:12.57 (→ 6th place)

Kiyomi Takahashi
 Heat — 2:14.37
 B-Final — 2:16.27 (→ 12th place)

Women's 200m Individual Medley
Hideka Koshimizu
 Heat — 2:23.38
 B-Final — 2:22.81 (→ 15th place)

Women's 400m Individual Medley
Hideka Koshimizu
 Heat — 4:59.18
 B-Final — 4:58.02 (→ 14th place)

Synchronized swimming

Volleyball

Men's Team Competition
Preliminary Round (Group B)
 Defeated China (3-0)
 Defeated Italy (3-2)
 Defeated Egypt (3-0)
 Lost to Canada (0-3)
Classification Matches
 5th/8th place: Lost to Argentina (1-3)
 7th/8th place: Defeated China (3-0) → 7th place

Team Roster
 Koshi Sobu
 Eiji Shimomura
 Kazuya Mitake
 Eizaburo Mitsuhashi
 Hiroaki Okuno
 Yasushi Furukawa 
 Shuji Yamada
 Mikiyasu Tanaka 
 Kimio Sugimoto
 Minoru Iwata
 Akihiro Iwashima
 Shunichi Kawai

Women's Team Competition
Preliminary Round (Group A)
 Defeated South Korea (3-1)
 Defeated Peru (3-0)
 Defeated Canada (3-0)
Semi Finals
 Lost to China (0-3)
Bronze Medal Match
 Defeated United States (3-1) →  Bronze Medal

Team Roster
 Yumi Egami
 Kimie Morita
 Yuko Mitsuya
 Miyoko Hirose
 Kyoko Ishida
 Yoko Kagabu
 Norie Hiro
 Kayoko Sugiiyama
 Sachiko Otani
 Keiko Miyajima
 Emiko Odaka
 Kumie Nakada

Water polo

Men's Team Competition
Preliminary Round (Group C)
 Lost to Italy (5-15)
 Lost to West Germany (8-15)
 Lost to Australia (2-15)
Final Round (Group E)
 Lost to China (4-10)
 Lost to Greece (7-14)
 Lost to Canada (5-8)
 Defeated Brazil (9-8) → 11th place

Team Roster
 Etsuji Fujita
 Yoshifumi Saito
 Koshi Fujimori
 Shingo Kai
 Narihito Taima
 Daisuke Houki
 Toshio Fukumoto
 Toshiyuki Miyahara
 Hisayoshi Nagata
 Koji Wakayoshi
 Hisaharu Saito
 Shinji Yamasaki
 Asami Oura

Weightlifting

Wrestling

References

Nations at the 1984 Summer Olympics
1984
Summer Olympics